Senator Bean may refer to:

Aaron Bean (born 1967), Florida State Senate
Benning M. Bean (1782–1866), New Hampshire State Senate
James Bean (1933–2013), Mississippi State Senate
Jim Bean (1932–2013), Mississippi State Senate
Ralph J. Bean (1912–1978), West Virginia State Senate